The History of Dedham, Massachusetts may refer to:

 History of Dedham, Massachusetts, 1635–1699
 History of Dedham, Massachusetts, 1700-1799
 History of Dedham, Massachusetts, 1800–1899
 History of Dedham, Massachusetts, 1900–1999
 History of Dedham, Massachusetts, 2000–present
 Timeline of Dedham, Massachusetts
 History of rail in Dedham, Massachusetts
 Lifestyles of early settlers of Dedham, Massachusetts
 Early government of Dedham, Massachusetts
 Dedham, Massachusetts in the American Civil War

 
Histories of cities in Massachusetts